Pendleton is an unincorporated community in Henry County, Kentucky, United States. Pendleton has a post office with ZIP code 40055.

References

Unincorporated communities in Henry County, Kentucky
Unincorporated communities in Kentucky